Cesare Rizzi (31 March 1940 – 28 July 2019) was an Italian politician who served as a Deputy.

References

1940 births
2019 deaths
Deputies of Legislature XIII of Italy
Deputies of Legislature XIV of Italy
Lega Nord politicians
People from the Province of Como